Caitlin Leahy is an American actress and model. She is known for her roles in the 2018 film Samson, and the television series Black-ish and Queen of the South.

Early life
Leahy was born and raised in Chicago, Illinois, to Matt and Ellen Leahy. The middle of five children, she has three sisters, Shannon, Cara, Brenna, and a brother, Ryan. She began training and performing at a young age, eventually studying theatre at the University of Illinois at Chicago before receiving her Bachelor of Arts from Columbia College Chicago.

Career

In 2016 Leahy guest starred on an episode of ABC’s "Black-ish” titled "Being Bow-Racial" which was the highest rated episode of season 3. Other notable roles include USA Network's "Queen of the South", Showtime's “Roadies”, ABC’s "Secrets & Lies”, and truTV’s “Those Who Can’t”.

In 2017 Leahy appeared in several TV series including BET's “Rebel", the Lifetime film “Michael Jackson: Searching for Neverland”, and FX's “Legion”.

In March 2017, Leahy was cast as the female lead in the epic action film “Samson” playing the role of Delilah. The movie which filmed in South Africa is set to be released in theatres on 16 February 2018. 

Leahy has modeled for numerous brands, such as Bentley Motors, Adidas, Chase Bank, Ritz Carlton, Honda, Schlitz Brewing Co. and HBO’s Eastbound & Down.

Filmography

Films

Television

References

External links
 

Living people
21st-century American actresses
Year of birth missing (living people)